The foot-pound force (symbol: ft⋅lbf,   ft⋅lbf, or ft⋅lb ) is a unit of work or energy in the engineering and gravitational systems in United States customary and imperial units of measure. It is the energy transferred upon applying a force of one pound-force (lbf) through a linear displacement of one foot.  The corresponding SI unit is the joule.

Usage
The foot-pound is often used to specify the muzzle energy of a bullet in small arms ballistics, particularly in the United States.

The term foot-pound is also used as a unit of torque (see pound-foot (torque)).  In the United States this is often used to specify, for example, the tightness of a fastener (such as screws and nuts) or the output of an engine.  Although they are dimensionally equivalent, energy (a scalar) and torque (a Euclidean vector) are distinct physical quantities. Both energy and torque can be expressed as a product of a force vector with a displacement vector (hence pounds and feet); energy is the scalar product of the two, and torque is the vector product.

Although calling the torque unit "pound-foot" has been academically suggested, both are still commonly called "foot-pound" in colloquial usage.  To avoid confusion, it is not uncommon for people to specify each as "foot-pound of energy" or "foot-pound of torque" respectively.

Conversion factors

Energy
1 foot pound-force is equivalent to:
  joules
  ergs
 about  British thermal units
  calories
  eV =  EeV =  GeV

Power
1 foot pound-force per second is equivalent to:
 1.3558179483314 watts
  horsepower

Related conversions:
 1 watt ≈  ft⋅lbf/min =  ft⋅lbf/s
 1 horsepower (mechanical) = 33,000 ft⋅lbf/min = 550 ft⋅lbf/s

See also
 Conversion of units
 Pound-foot (torque)
 Poundal
 Slug (unit)
 Units of energy

References

Customary units of measurement in the United States
Imperial units
Units of energy